Bryan Matthew Little (born November 12, 1987) is a Canadian professional ice hockey player currently under contract for the Arizona Coyotes of the National Hockey League (NHL). Little was selected by the Atlanta Thrashers in the first round, 12th overall, of the 2006 NHL Entry Draft. In November 2019, Little was injured in a game and has not played since.

Early life
Although Little was born in Edmonton, Alberta, he was raised in Cambridge, Ontario. He grew up with his younger brother Shawn and his parents, Brenda and John. Little played much of his minor ice hockey for the Cambridge Hawks of the Alliance Pavilion League until the 2001–02 season. He played in the 2001 Quebec International Pee-Wee Hockey Tournament with Cambridge. He then played for the Cambridge Winter Hawks Jr. B hockey team at age 14, while he attended Southwood Secondary School until age 15, when he joined the Barrie Colts of the Ontario Hockey League (OHL). Little had been selected in the third round, 50th overall, in the 2003 OHL Draft after a standout season with the Winter Hawks.

Playing career

Little was selected first round, 12th overall, in the 2006 NHL Entry Draft by the Atlanta Thrashers. After four seasons playing for the Barrie Colts in the Ontario Hockey League (OHL), during which he played in the 2006 CHL–NHL Top Prospects Game, Little joined the Thrashers' American Hockey League (AHL) affiliate, the Chicago Wolves, for two games in the 2007 Calder Cup playoffs, recording no points or penalties. According to one local columnist, "He didn't play much, and he was playing out of position, but the biggest thing was that he fit right in ... he played like he'd been there all season."

Little signed a three-year, entry-level contract with the Thrashers running until the end of the 2009–10 NHL season. He made the Thrashers' NHL roster out of training camp in 2007 and joined the team full-time. He made his NHL debut on October 5, 2007, scoring in his first game, the first Thrasher ever to do so. However, midway through the season, he was demoted to the Wolves, where he would go on to win the 2008 Calder Cup Championship. He would spend the entire 2008–09 NHL season with the Thrashers, scoring 31 goals.

In August 2010, Little signed a three-year, $7.15 million contract extension with Atlanta as a restricted free agent. After the Thrashers organization relocated to Winnipeg to become the Winnipeg Jets prior to the 2011–12 season, Little changed his uniform number from #10 to #18 out of respect for Dale Hawerchuk, who played for the original Winnipeg Jets.

On July 22, 2013, Little and the Jets agreed to a five-year, $23.5 million contract extension, avoiding salary arbitration. In the first year of his new contract in 2013–14, Little had a career year offensively, scoring 64 points in 82 games. He signed a six-year contract extension on September 14, 2017.

Little joined the team for the 2019–20 season but sustained a concussion during a preseason game against the Minnesota Wild. He was cleared to play for the regular season but only appeared in seven games before being struck in the side of the head by a shot on November 5. He returned to practice in January but further tests and medical advice resulted in him not returning for the remainder of the season. A month later in February, Little underwent surgery to repair a perforated eardrum. As a result of the surgery, Little was ruled out for the entirety of the 2020–21 season.

On March 21, 2022, the Jets traded his contract to the Arizona Coyotes, alongside the rights to prospect Nathan Smith, for a fourth round draft pick. It is not expected that Little will play in the NHL again.

International play

Little was first selected in an international tournament for the Team Ontario in 2003–04 in the World Under-17 Hockey Challenge in Newfoundland, winning a gold medal. He was then included with Canadian National Under-18 Summer Team at the 2004 World Junior Cup in Břeclav, Czech Republic, and invited to the December 2005 Canadian World Junior hockey team selection camp. Little was a member of the gold-medal winning 2007 Canadian World Junior hockey team.

Personal life
, Little and his wife Brittany resided in his childhood hometown of Cambridge, Ontario, when he was not living in Winnipeg during the hockey season.

Career statistics

Regular season and playoffs

International

Awards and honours
2003–04 OHL Rookie of the Year
2004–05 Eastern Conference OHL All-Star.
2005–06 Barrie Colts team Captain.
2006–07 Set the Barrie Colts current club record for most goals scored with the team.
2006–07 Set the Barrie Colts current club record for most points earned with the team.
2010–11 Dan Snyder Memorial Award
2013-14 Dan Snyder Memorial Award
January 25, 2020 Barrie Colts retire Little’s number 18 jersey

References

External links

1987 births
Living people
Atlanta Thrashers draft picks
Atlanta Thrashers players
Barrie Colts players
Canadian ice hockey centres
Chicago Wolves players
Ice hockey people from Ontario
National Hockey League first-round draft picks
Sportspeople from Cambridge, Ontario
Ice hockey people from Edmonton
Winnipeg Jets players